{{Infobox radio station
| name             = WJBM
| logo             =
| city             = Jerseyville, Illinois
| area             = Jersey, Greene, and Calhoun counties
| branding         = Real Country 104.7/1480''| frequency        = 1480 kHz AM
| translator       = 104.7 MHz (W284DN - Jerseyville, Illinois)
| repeater         = 
| airdate          = June 23, 1960 (first license granted)
| format           = Country music
| power            = 500 watts day32 watts night
| erp              = 
| haat             = 
| class            = D
| facility_id      = 23265
| coordinates      = 
| callsign_meaning = 
| former_callsigns = 
| owner            = DJ Two Rivers Radio
| licensee         = 
| sister_stations  = WBBA-FM
| webcast          = 
| website          = www.wjbmradio.com
| affiliations     =  
}}WJBM (1480 AM) is a radio station  broadcasting a Country music format. It is licensed to Jerseyville, Illinois, United States.  The station is currently owned by DJ Two Rivers Radio which purchased WJBM in 2003, along with its sister station WBBA-FM, from Brown Radio Group Inc. for $320,000. WJBM broadcast an oldies format at the time of its sale.

Current programmingMonday - Friday12–6am – Real Country
6–8am – Real Country Morning Show w/Alley Ringhausen
8am – 9am – Real Country Morning Show w/Craig Baalman
9am – 10am – RFD Today
10am – 11am – Adams on Agriculture
11am – noon – Real Country
noon – 1pm – Real Country Lunch Break w/Craig Baalman
1–midnight – Real CountrySaturday'''
12–8am – Real Country
8–9am – Real Country Morning Show Saturday w/Craig Baalman
9–midnight – Real Country

References

External links
WJBM Real Country facebook
Station Website

JBM
Jersey County, Illinois
Jerseyville, Illinois